Fargoa dianthophila, common name the serpulid odostome, is a species of sea snail, a marine gastropod mollusk in the family Pyramidellidae, the pyrams and their allies.

Description
The shell grows to a length of 1.8 mm

Distribution
This species occurs in the following locations:
 Gulf of Mexico (Texas)
 North West Atlantic (Massachusetts)

Notes
Additional information regarding this species:
 Distribution: Range: 41.5°N to 25°N; 96°W to 70.7°W. Distribution: USA: Massachusetts, North Carolina, Florida; Florida: East Florida, West Florida; USA: Texas

References

External links
 To Biodiversity Heritage Library (2 publications)
 To Encyclopedia of Life
 To ITIS
 To World Register of Marine Species
 

Pyramidellidae
Gastropods described in 1961